Cheng Yiu-tong GBM, JP (born 14 October 1948 in Hong Kong) is a non-official member of the Executive Council of Hong Kong. He was appointed as the president of the Hong Kong Federation of Trade Unions in April 2000. He is also the Hong Kong delegate to the National People's Congress of the People's Republic of China.

On 1 July 2015, Cheng was awarded the Grand Bauhinia Medal (GBM), the highest honour of the SAR, in recognition of his contributions to the formulation of labour policies and promotion labour relations in Hong Kong with pragmatic and reasonable approach which helped maintaining the business-friendly environment, and also promoting charity and social services to disadvantaged group and enhancing cooperation with the Mainland.

References

External links
The Honourable CHENG Yiu-tong, GBS, JP

1948 births
Living people
People from Zhuhai
Hong Kong trade unionists
Hong Kong Federation of Trade Unions
Delegates to the 7th National People's Congress
Delegates to the 8th National People's Congress from Hong Kong
Delegates to the 9th National People's Congress from Hong Kong
Delegates to the 10th National People's Congress from Hong Kong
Delegates to the 11th National People's Congress from Hong Kong
Delegates to the 12th National People's Congress from Hong Kong
Delegates to the 13th National People's Congress from Hong Kong
Members of the Executive Council of Hong Kong
Members of the Provisional Legislative Council
HK LegCo Members 1995–1997
Members of the Selection Committee of Hong Kong
Members of the Preparatory Committee for the Hong Kong Special Administrative Region
Hong Kong Basic Law Consultative Committee members
Hong Kong Affairs Advisors
Jinan University alumni
Recipients of the Grand Bauhinia Medal
Recipients of the Gold Bauhinia Star